Orion Publishing Group Ltd. is a UK-based book publisher. It was founded in 1991 and acquired Weidenfeld & Nicolson the following year. The group has published numerous bestselling books by notable authors including Ian Rankin, Michael Connelly, Nemir Kirdar and Quentin Tarantino.

History
Orion Books was launched in 1992, with Orion purchasing the assets of Chapman publishers the following year. In the same year (1993), Orion acquired a warehousing and distribution centre called Littlehampton Book Services (LBS), which was based in Sussex in the UK. A majority share capital of Orion was sold to Hachette Livre in 1998, before Hachette Livre became the sole owner of the Orion Publishing Group in 2003. In December 1998, Orion acquired publishing house Cassell, whose imprints included Victor Gollancz Ltd. This imprint became a part of the Orion group and Orion also took ownership of the Cassell Military list. After acquiring Hodder Headline, Hachette UK was formed, with Orion as its largest single component.

Awards

Hachette's Orion division won the 2021 British Book Awards "Publisher of The Year" title for outstanding success during the 2020 calendar year. Each of its lists recorded a sharp increase in sales, with eight books topping £1,000,000 in sales. There were bestsellers from Ian Rankin and Michael Connelly in fiction, along with strong sales from Noel Fitzpatrick and Arsene Wenger on the non-fiction side. This financial success, along with "virtual events and effective digital marketing" (Adam Kay's Dear NHS anthology raised nearly £400,000) saw the Orion Group win the publishers' prize in 2021.

Imprints

The group's imprints include:
Gollancz
Laurence King Publishing
Orion Fiction
Orion Spring
 Phoenix Books
 Seven Dials
Trapeze
Weidenfeld & Nicolson

Orion Children's Books is an imprint of Hachette Children's Group.

The group also distributes books for the independent Halban Publishers.

Distribution
Books distributed through Littlehampton Book Services.

See also 
 List of largest UK book publishers
 UK children's book publishers

References

External links

 
.
1991 establishments in England
Book publishing companies based in London
British companies established in 1991
British subsidiaries of foreign companies
Lagardère Media
Publishing companies established in 1991